Fred John Furman (October 1881 – December 29, 1938) was an American football coach. He served as the head football coach at Mississippi A&M (now known as Mississippi State University) for the 1907 and 1908 seasons. During his two-season tenure, Furman compiled an overall record of nine wins and seven losses (9–7).

Fred lettered for Cornell in the 1904 and 1905 seasons under head coach Pop Warner. Fred's brother, Harry "Little" Furman, played for Mississippi A&M in 1907 and 1908, and was the captain of the 1908 team. Harry is tied with Anthony Dixon for third on the single season rushing touchdown list at Mississippi State having scored 14 in 1907.

Head coaching record

References

1881 births
1938 deaths
Cornell Big Red football players
Mississippi State Bulldogs athletic directors
Mississippi State Bulldogs football coaches